State Route 155 (SR-155) or the Cleveland Loop is a  state highway in the U.S. state of Utah. It forms a loop off SR-10 in Emery County, connecting it with the town of Cleveland.

Route description
State Route 155 starts at SR-10 near Huntington Reservoir just north of the town of Huntington. From there it travels east toward the town of Cleveland, entering the town as Main Street, then turning north on Center Street.

History
State Route 155 was established by the Utah state legislature on June 26, 1933 as the "Cleveland Loop". The description was revised in 1953 to reflect the current designated route, namely, Huntington on Route 10 to Cleveland to Washboard Junction on Route 10. Only two minor alignment changes have taken place since then. In 1965 the west end of the route, where it meets SR-10, was moved southeast to accommodate the realignment of SR-10 due to the construction of Huntington Reservoir (former route SR-236, which shared the same intersection with SR-10 and SR-155, was also realigned at the same time). In 1969, the north end of SR-155 was moved slightly to the northwest to accommodate a realignment of SR-10 due to new construction.

Major Intersections

References

 155
155